The Ultimate Song Chart Awards Presentation 2021 was held at the AsiaWorld–Expo on 1 January 2022. It recognized the best Cantopop recordings, compositions, and artistes of the eligibility year.

Winners

References

2021 in Hong Kong
2021 music awards